Broadchurch is a British television crime drama programme broadcast on ITV. It was created and written by Chris Chibnall and produced by Kudos Film and Television, Shine America, and Imaginary Friends. The first series focuses on the death of an 11-year-old boy and the impact of grief, mutual suspicion, and media attention on the town; it premiered on 4 March 2013. The second series began its ITV broadcast on 5 January 2015. The third series was confirmed on 23 February 2015, immediately following the second series finale, and premiered on 27 February 2017, and concluded on 17 April 2017.

Series overview

Episodes

Series 1 (2013)

Series 2 (2015)

Series 3 (2017)

References

Lists of British crime drama television series episodes
Lists of British mystery television series episodes